Lucia Galeazzi Galvani (3 June 1743, in Bologna – 1788) was an Italian scientist.

She was the daughter of anatomist Domenico Gusmano Galeazzi and Paola Mini, and granddaughter of the painter Domenico Galeazzi.  In 1762 she married the doctor Luigi Galvani, a professor at the University of Bologna from 1775. In 1772, the couple moved to their own home at Galeazzi, where she and her spouse established a laboratory for the studies of the reflexes of the animal anatomy. Lucia Galeazzi Galvani was actively engaged in the experiments; the couple also collaborated with Antonio Muzzi. Lucia Galeazzi Galvani also was active as the medical assistant of her husband in his work as a surgeon and obstetrician. She additionally edited her husband's medical texts. She died of asthma.

She encouraged and participated in her husband's independent research and served as a counselor and research colleague for his experiments until her death. Due to the conventions of the time she wasn't credited for any of her scientific work in the lab. She grew up with science and her father was a prominent member of the Bologna Academy of Science.

References 

 Galeazzi Galvani Lucia (Italian)
 M. Focaccia,  R. Simili, Luigi Galvani physician, surgeon, physicist: from animal electricity to electro-physiology, in Brain, Mind and Medicine: Essays in Eighteenth Century Neuroscience, a cura di H. Whitaker, C.U.M Smith, S. Finger, Springer, 2007, pp. 145–58.

1743 births
1788 deaths
Scientists from Bologna
18th-century Italian women scientists
18th-century Italian physicians
Italian women biologists
19th-century women physicians